The 1988 Copa del Rey Final was the 86th final of the King's Cup. The final was played at Santiago Bernabéu Stadium in Madrid, on 31 March 1988, being won by Barcelona, who beat Real Sociedad 1–0.

Details

References

1988
Copa
FC Barcelona matches
Real Sociedad matches